The South Platte River Bridge, in South Park near Lake George, Colorado, was built in 1920.  It was listed on the National Register of Historic Places in 2018.

It is a  bridge consisting of two  deck girder spans.  It was built in 1920 and then carried State Highway 8 over the South Platte River.  The road later became State Highway 4, then U.S Highway 40 South, and then U.S. Highway 24.  Highway 24 was rerouted, and the bridge was closed to vehicular traffic in 2008.

It is located at the northwest end of the town of Lake George, next to the Lake George Reservoir.  It is often used for fishing.

See also
South Platte River Bridges, in Denver

References

Bridges in Colorado
National Register of Historic Places in Park County, Colorado
Infrastructure completed in 1920